Achaea  macronephra is a fruit piercing moth of the  family Erebidae. It is found in Congo.

References

External links
Africamuseum.be: pictures of Achaea macronephra

Achaea (moth)
Moths described in 1956
Erebid moths of Africa